The mayor of Cleveland is the head of the executive branch of government of the City of Cleveland, Ohio. As the chief executive in Cleveland's mayor–council (strong mayor) system, the mayor oversees all city services and is "responsible for enforcing the city charter, city ordinances, and the laws of the State of Ohio." The mayor's office is located at Cleveland City Hall at 601 Lakeside Avenue in Downtown Cleveland. Since 1836, the city has had a total of 54 mayors, including the city's current mayor, Justin Bibb, encompassing 58 mayoral administrations, as four mayors have served in non-consecutive terms.

History
Cleveland was established by General Moses Cleaveland and surveyors of the Connecticut Land Company on July 22, 1796. The settlement (then known as "Cleaveland", after its founder) was incorporated as a village on December 23, 1814. At this time, the position of municipal executive was the village president. Alfred Kelley was the first to be elected to that post in June 1815. When Cleveland became a city in 1836, it adopted a mayor–council form of government. John W. Willey was the city's first mayor.

Initially, Cleveland City Council had greater power in Cleveland's city government, but this changed with the adoption of the 1892 Federal Plan, which significantly strengthened the office of the mayor. When the plan was ruled unconstitutional in 1902 by the Supreme Court of Ohio, the powers of the mayor were lessened in the city's new municipal code. However, after the state granted Cleveland municipal home rule in 1912, the role of the mayor was enhanced in the 1913 municipal charter. When the city adopted a council–manager government in 1924, the city manager, selected by council, assumed the role of the municipal executive. However, the council–manager experiment was brief and, in November 1931, voters approved returning to the mayor–council system.

For much of Cleveland's history, mayoral elections were partisan, but in 1971, under the mayoral administration of Ralph Perk, the city amended its charter to make elections nonpartisan. The term of office for the mayor and members of council was traditionally two years, but was extended to four years in 1981 under Mayor George Voinovich. According to the Cleveland City Charter, there are currently no term limits for the mayor.

Presidents, 1815–1835

Mayors since 1836

Longest-serving mayors

Mayors of Ohio City, 1836–1854
Prior to its annexation on June 5, 1854, Ohio City was a separate municipality and a fierce rival of Cleveland. It had twelve mayoral administrations from 1836 to 1854.

See also
Cleveland City Council
County Executive of Cuyahoga County, Ohio

Notes

References

Further reading

External links

Office of the Mayor of the City of Cleveland

Mayor
Cleveland
 
Mayors of Cleveland
1836 establishments in Ohio